Roberto Freire may refer to:

 Roberto Freire (politician) (born 1942), Brazilian politician
 Roberto Freire (psychiatrist) (1927–2008), Brazilian psychiatrist

See also
 Freire